Jussi Kristian Halla-aho (born 27 April 1971) is a Finnish politician who has served as a member of the Parliament of Finland from 2011 to 2014 and again since 2019, and as the leader of the Finns Party from 10 June 2017 to 14 August 2021. Previously, between 2014 and 2019, he was a member of the European Parliament, where he was part of the Identity and Democracy group.

Halla-aho is a Slavic linguist by education. Before entering national politics, he was best known for criticising multiculturalism and Finland's immigration policies in his online blog, Scripta. He was first elected to the Helsinki City Council in 2008 and to the Finnish parliament in 2011. In 2014 he was elected to the European Parliament. He was elected leader of the Finns Party in the summer of 2017, defeating Sampo Terho, after which the majority of the party's MPs seceded in protest and formed a new party. In spite of this, Halla-aho led the Finns Party to success in the 2019 election: it recovered all of its lost seats, becoming the second-largest party in parliament (after the Social Democratic Party), and Halla-aho won the largest share of personal votes in the country.

Early life

Halla-aho grew up in Tampere and lived there 24 years. His mother was from Alajärvi.  During the 1980s he travelled to the Soviet Union with his father, who was a bus driver.  The trip was the spark for his anti-leftist convictions. When Halla-aho was young he worked as a waiter. When conscripted, instead of military service he chose civilian service. He later expressed regret at his decision, calling the choice a "stupid political protest", and voicing support for the present conscription system.

Education

After high school graduation, Halla-aho enrolled in Pirkanmaa Hotel and Restaurant Institute, where he obtained a professional degree to become a restaurant waiter.
Halla-aho studied at the University of Helsinki from 1995 until 2006. After obtaining a master's degree in 2000, he continued with doctoral studies, and obtained a Ph.D. in 2006, focusing his dissertation on historical nominal morphology of Old Church Slavonic. He has published one article in an academic journal. After graduation, he left academia and worked on a part-time basis supported by short-term academic grants.

Political career

Electoral results
Halla-aho was elected a member of Helsinki City Council in the 2008 municipal elections as a candidate of the Finns Party (previously known as True Finns), although he was not a member of the party until 2010. In the 2008 elections, he was the 18th most popular candidate in the entire country and the second most popular candidate of the Finns Party after the party leader Timo Soini. Halla-aho won the largest number of personal votes for the party in
Helsinki.

Halla-aho was elected to parliament in 2011. His vote share was the sixth highest in the country and the second highest within his party. In the parliament he was made chairman of the Administration Committee, which deals with immigration affairs among other matters. However, in the summer of 2012 Halla-aho resigned from the position of committee chairman, while staying as a member of the committee. Halla-aho was re-elected to the Helsinki City Council in 2012, being the third most popular candidate nationwide.

Halla-aho was elected to the European Parliament in 2014. He was the second most popular candidate in the election with 80,772 votes. He sits in the European Conservatives and Reformists Group (ECR). He is a member of the Committee on Civil Liberties, Justice and Home Affairs, and a substitute member of the Committee on the Internal Market and Consumer Protection.

In 2017, Halla-aho announced he would run for the party chair in the Finns Party leadership election, as the long-time leader of the party Timo Soini decided not to seek another term. During the campaign, Halla-aho and Sampo Terho emerged as the leading candidates, according to opinion polls. Halla-aho emerged victorious in the party conference in Jyväskylä on 10 June, winning a majority of delegates in the first round, and was officially nominated as the Leader of the Finns Party. His selection resulted in a political crisis in Finland, as the leaders of the two other governing coalition parties, Prime Minister Juha Sipilä of Centre and Finance Minister Petteri Orpo of the NCP, stated they would not co-operate with the Finns Party led by Halla-aho. The two leaders argued that their decision was based on value differences between them and Halla-aho's policies, and that the Sipilä Cabinet would duly be dissolved. On 13 June, however, twenty Finns MPs, including former leader Soini, broke away from the parliamentary group and founded New Alternative. Sipilä announced that his cabinet would continue working with New Alternative (later called Blue Reform), thus securing a parliamentary majority, and leaving the remaining Finns MPs in opposition.

Halla-aho led the remainder of the party into the 2019 parliamentary election, gaining one new seat in comparison to the 2015 elections, while none of the Blue Reform candidates got elected. Halla-aho did personally gain the most votes in the whole country and broke the record for most personal votes in Helsinki constituency.

In June 2021, Halla-aho informed that he is not running for re-election as chairman of party, but will continue in parliament and municipality.

Parliamentary elections

Municipal elections

European Parliament elections

Political interests
Halla-aho has stated that he became politically active because he finds the Finnish immigration policy a problem and believes that Europe is heading towards a catastrophe because of massive immigration. Halla-aho voices support for the welfare state, and places himself on the left side of the political spectrum, in matters of economic policy. Still, he maintains that, all sides taken into account, if forced to choose between left-wing and right-wing politics he would choose the right-wing.

Halla-aho maintains a blog titled Scripta which states that it treats issues such as "immigration, multiculturalism, tolerance, racism, freedom of speech and political correctness". His blog had between 3,000 and 6,000 readers a day in 2008, which made him the best known political blogger in Finland according to the newspaper Aamulehti.

In a 2007 interview with Helsingin Sanomat Halla-aho explained his opposition to multiculturalism in the following way:

In Finland the starting point [of the conversation] is that multiculturalism is a richness in itself. This is an untenable claim. When rival value systems and codes of conduct are accepted in a society, it leads automatically to conflicts. Finland is no exception. It is mainly the attributes of the Muslim cultures, that make the integration of these groups into Finland impossible, as long as they hold on to their special characteristics and as long as the society encourages them to wrap themselves in this otherness. It creates a spiral of social exclusion and ethnic ghettoisation.

Halla-aho has demanded that positive discrimination and what he calls privileges due to culture or nationality should not be allowed. Referring to his own works, he has affirmed that criticising "totalitarian fascist ideologies like political Islam" should not be considered racism and that facts cannot be criminalised. According to Halla-aho, immigration is a taboo in Finland. He has disclosed that he has received death threats because of his web columns.

Halla-aho has been accused of racism by academics and members of the Finnish government, and has been connected to the counterjihad movement. He denies that he is xenophobic and maintains that he is simply “critical of immigration”, and that he has supporters among immigrants, as well.

Criminal charges and conviction
In December 2008, Halla-aho was put under investigation for incitement to ethnic or racial hatred (under Finnish law referred to as "ethnic agitation") for remarks published on his blog.<ref
name="Investigation">Police to Investigate Helsinki City Council Member's Blog YLE, 12.12.2008 </ref>

On 27 March 2009, the Helsinki District Court ordered Halla-aho to stand for trial on charges of ethnic agitation and breach of the sanctity of religion. The charges were raised on the basis of remarks related to the sentencing of Seppo Lehto on Halla-aho's blog in 2008. Here, he wrote that the prophet Muhammad was a pedophile, making reference to Muhammad's relationship with Aisha, and that Islam is a religion that sanctifies pedophilia. In another text, he asked if it could be stated that robbing passersby and living on taxpayers' expense are cultural and possibly genetic characteristics of Somalis. The text was originally a response to a Finnish columnist of the newspaper Kaleva, who had written that drinking excessively and killing when drunk were cultural and possibly genetic characteristics of Finns and was intended to underline the hypocrisy of it being possible to be prosecuted for one of those essentially similar statements but not for the other.

On 8 September 2009, the District Court convicted Halla-aho of disturbing religious worship, and ordered him to pay a fine of 330 euros. The charge of ethnic agitation was dismissed. In October 2010 the Court of Appeal agreed with the District Court's conviction. Both the prosecutor and Halla-aho appealed the case to the Supreme Court. The Supreme Court granted a leave to appeal in May 2011. In a sentence given on the 8 of June 2012, the Supreme Court found Halla-aho guilty of both disturbing religious worship and of ethnic agitation and increased his fines accordingly to 400 euros.

In 2019 Halla-aho said he still stands by his texts.

Other controversies
In December 2006 Halla-aho wrote in his blog Scripta on immigration that, “Since rapes will increase in any case, the appropriate people should be raped: in other words, green-leftist do-gooders and their supporters", naming some of the politicians which led to a police investigation.

In September 2011 Halla-aho wrote in Facebook that Greece's debt problems cannot be resolved without a military junta. He soon retracted the comment, clarifying that his intention was merely to point out that making necessary but unpopular decisions is not easy in a democracy. Timo Soini, the leader of the party, demanded a temporary suspension of Halla-aho from the parliamentary group. In the end the parliamentary group unanimously (Halla-aho himself included) suspended Halla-aho for two weeks, although Soini had initially called for a month-long suspension.

Personal life
Halla-aho lives in Eira in Helsinki with his wife Hilla Halla-aho and their four children. In May 2017, it was revealed that he had also had one child with another woman in 2015. Information was leaked to the press by the unnamed mother, who was disappointed that Halla-aho had always mentioned publicly that he only had four children. Halla-aho confirmed the information when asked, but declined to further comment it.

Halla-aho's hobbies include reading astronomy as well as pistol and rifle shooting. He used to be a member of Suomen Sisu, an association that seeks to promote Finnish nationalism. He quit the association in June 2019, emphasizing that he doesn't want to be affiliated with an organization that promotes ethnic nationalism. He is not a member in the Evangelical Lutheran Church of Finland, and considers himself a moderate agnostic atheist.

Halla-aho is occasionally referred as Mestari (The Master) as a joke among his supporters.

Publications

Academic works
 Halla-aho, Jussi: Problems of Proto-Slavic historical nominal morphology: On the basis of Old Church Slavic.  Slavica Helsingiensia 26, Helsinki, University of Helsinki, Department of Slavonic Languages, 2006.  
 Halla-aho, Jussi: Two borrowings in Proto-Slavic; and a minor Balto-Slavic sound change, Journal of Indo-European Studies 33, p. 233-245, 2005. 
 Halla-aho, Jussi: “The collapse of an early Proto-Indo-European ablaut pattern.” Indogermanische Forschungen 110, p. 97-118, 2005. 
 Nuorluoto, Juhani & Leiwo, Martti & Halla-aho, Jussi (editors): Papers in Slavic, Baltic and Balkan studies, Slavica Helsingiensia 21, Helsinki, University of Helsinki, Department of Slavonic and Baltic Languages and Literatures, 2001  (Selection of papers by Slavists, Baltologists and Balkanists from Austria/Croatia, Canada, Finland, Latvia, Poland, Russia and the United States of America) 
 Halla-aho, Jussi: Old Church Slavic Manual. Helsinki, Jussi Halla-aho, 2006

Political works
 Halla-aho, Jussi: Kirjoituksia uppoavasta Lännestä, Jussi Halla-aho, 2009 
In 2009, Halla-aho published a collection of his web columns titled Kirjoituksia uppoavasta Lännestä (Writings from the sinking West or Writings about the sinking West) in print. The book's first edition sold out in three days.

References

External links

 Jussi Halla-aho – Halla-aho's personal homepage 
 Scripta – Halla-aho's blog 
 Inter arma – Halla-aho's column on gun control 

1971 births
Living people
Politicians from Tampere
Leaders of the Finns Party
Members of the Parliament of Finland (2011–15)
Members of the Parliament of Finland (2019–23)
MEPs for Finland 2014–2019
Critics of Islamism
Finnish agnostics
Finnish bloggers
Historical linguists
Linguists from Finland
People convicted of racial hatred offences
Finnish political websites
Slavists
Counter-jihad activists